Detective Byomkesh Bakshy! is a 2015 Indian Hindi-language mystery action thriller film directed by Dibakar Banerjee, and produced by Banerjee and Aditya Chopra. The story is based on the fictional detective Byomkesh Bakshi created by the Bengali writer Sharadindu Bandyopadhyay.

The film stars Sushant Singh Rajput, Anand Tiwari, Neeraj Kabi and Swastika Mukherjee. It was released on 3 April 2015 to positive reviews from critics; however, it was a commercial failure. A sequel with Rajput reprising his role was planned but after his death, the film was shelved.

Plot 
In November 1942, shortly after the Japanese take over Burma, a group of Chinese men from the Green Gang are unloading opium in Calcutta but get ambushed, with their leader being brutally blinded by a mysterious figure.

Three months later, the leader decides to return to Calcutta to investigate their missing opium. Meanwhile, Ajit Kumar Banerjee approaches Byomkesh Bakshi so he can find his missing father Bhuvan Banerjee. Byomkesh initially rejects the request but decides to check it out after his lover marries someone else. The following day, he visits the lodging house Bhuvan resided in, run by physician Dr. Anukul Guha, and takes a room to investigate. He finds Bhuvan's paan box with Ashwini Babu, Bhuvan's roommate, and deduces that he was murdered. Byomkesh visits the closed chemical factory where Bhuvan used to work, where he meets an actress, Anguri Devi, a movie actress and a friend of the owner Gajanan Sikdaar. Byomkesh finds some letters with Anguri Devi and deduces that Bhuvan was blackmailing Sikdaar, and Sikdaar might have killed Bhuvan and hid his body in the factory.

Byomkesh and Dr. Guha return to the factory and find Bhuvan's body in a machine, causing Deputy Commissioner Wilkie to question Sikdaar. However, Byomkesh discovers the letters are falsely backdated and saves Sikdaar from being framed. Byomkesh follows him home but is stopped by Anguri Devi, who attempts to seduce him. Gently rebuffing her, he goes to meet Sikdaar, who immediately has a fit and passes away, having been poisoned. Suspicion falls on Sukumar, who was seen making death threats to Sikdaar. Dr. Guha leaves Calcutta temporarily but sends Byomkesh a stamp, confirming he had faked the letters and killed Bhuvan. Satyavati, Sukumar's sister, pleads with Byomkesh to help her brother, who she believes is innocent and in hiding. Byomkesh finds the cab Sukumar was last seen in, and the driver directs him to the office of Dr. Watanabe, a Japanese dentist. Byomkesh and Ajit go to meet Watanabe, saying they are volunteers for Sukumar's Basant Panchami agitation, but Watanabe sees through them and sends a real volunteer to tail them. Having observed this, Byomkesh disguises himself and Ajit before following the volunteer back to Watanabe's office. Discovering the ruse, Watanabe murders the volunteer and his receptionist before escaping. The two enter his office and see their corpses; Byomkesh finds a drawing in the volunteer's pocket.

Returning to the lodge, they meet Dr. Guha, who admits he and Sukumar are working with the Japanese to free the country, with Sukumar to lead a "Free Bengal", and murdered Bhuvan and Sikdaar for betraying them. Returning to their room, Ajit vents about his father, revealing Bhuvan had lost his job at Hind Chemicals when they learned his master formula contained opium and addicted customers. Realising Ashwini is addicted to Bhuvan's custom paan blend, Byomkesh takes a chew and euphorically creates a mural of his understanding of the entire case, revealing Sikdaar said the words “Young Gun” to him before dying. The next morning, Byomkesh tests the mixture and his own blood; while his blood contains heroin, the paan is clean, making him deduce that Bhuvan had created an "untraceable" formula. Byomkesh learns from Kanai Dao, a fellow lodge resident and licensed opium dealer, that the opium supply in the local areas has been halted, and asks him if he can help Byomkesh meet any heroin suppliers. However, Kanai turns out to be a police informer and turns Byomkesh and Ajit into Deputy Commissioner Wilkie. Wilkie tells Byomkesh about Yang Guang, a former Green Gang leader who wanted Calcutta's opium business for himself and was killed in retaliation but reportedly survived; Byomkesh realises Sikdaar was referring to him.

Byomkesh discovers the drawing actually depicts the course of the Ganges through Calcutta and Sukumar's campaign points. With Kanai's help, Byomkesh meets with the Green Gang, where they realise Yang had and set a deal with the Japanese to use opium smuggling routes to invade Calcutta by surprise on Basant Panchami, in turn giving Yang control over the city's drug trade. Byomkesh also realizes that Anguri Devi is Yang's lover, who she has not met in 4 years, and she had killed Sikdaar and attempted to seduce Byomkesh on his orders while being unaware of Yang's deal with the Japanese. With the attack scheduled for the next day, Byomkesh meets Wilkie and requests him to set off all the air raid sirens at four in the morning, but Wilkie refuses, and Kanai defects to Byomkesh for saving him from the Green Gang. Byomkesh requests Dr. Guha, Satyavati, Sukumar and Dr. Watanabe to meet him at the lodge, pretending to have joined them and claiming they have been betrayed. At the lodge, he reveals Dr. Guha is Yang Guang, conned the idealistic Sukumar into his deal, and plans to make Calcutta the drug capital of the world. Byomkesh states he informed the authorities about the landing points, but Yang claims he is bluffing. Anguri Devi attempts to dissuade Yang, nearly shooting him, but he shows affection to draw her in before stabbing her. The air raid sirens are set off; using this, Byomkesh convinces Watanabe to leave and stop the attack to save his men. The Green Gang, having secretly observed the proceedings with Kanai's help, attack Yang.

Byomkesh informs a panicking Satyavati that he was indeed bluffing before being struck unconscious in the chaos. Regaining consciousness, Byomkesh is told by Ajit that the Green Gang has taken Yang. Byomkesh asks Satyavati to marry him, to which she smiles in reply. Meanwhile, the Green Gang's blinded leader orders his son to blind Yang in revenge at an abandoned factory, but Yang purposely blinds himself with the poker to turn the tables and kill the gang instead, planning the same for Byomkesh. As the factory siren rings, Byomkesh realises something amiss.

Cast
 Sushant Singh Rajput as Byomkesh Bakshi
 Anand Tiwari as Ajit Kumar Banerjee
 Neeraj Kabi as Dr. Anukul Guha/Yang Guang
 Divya Menon as Satyavati 
 Swastika Mukherjee as Anguri Devi
 Meiyang Chang as Kanai Dao
 Moumita Chakraborty as Leela
 Mark Bennington as Deputy Commissioner Wilkie
 Arindol Bagchi as Ashwini Babu
 Aryann Bhowmik as  Young Revolutionary 
 Manoshi Nath as Ruby
 Lauren Gottlieb (special appearance in the song "Calcutta Kiss")

Production

Development
Dibakar Banerjee expressed his desire to make a film on Byomkesh Bakshi so that India will get its own detective. On 28 June 2013, the co-production venture of YRF and Dibakar Banerjee Productions officially announces its first directorial outing with Banerjee titled Detective Byomkesh Bakshy! In July 2013, Banerjee revealed that YRF had bought the rights of "31 of Byomkesh novels in all languages outside Bangla".

Before shooting, workshops were held for the cast. In an interview Rajput said, "I have taken leave for two to three months for Detective Byomkesh Bakshy! after the release of Shuddh Desi Romance. A lot has to be done for the film like the look of the 1940s' hairstyle, body, accent, but all after this film". The costume was designed by the designer Manish Malhotra.

The sets were designed by Vandana Kataria and, accordingly, the set up will showcase the lifestyle of the people who were living during the turbulent times of World War II. To give the look of 1943, the heritage zone of B. B. D. Bagh was transported back to the pre-Independence era with vintage cars and old trams back on the streets. As reports suggest, a lot of VFX will be used to reflect old world charm.

Casting
After Khosla Ka Ghosla, Dibakar Banerjee wanted to make this film and he approached Aamir Khan to play the villain. Eventually the deal was cancelled because Aamir chose Dhoom 3 over it. Sushant Singh Rajput was roped in to play the role of Byomkesh Bakshi in mid-2013. Earlier reports suggested that fashion designer Sabyasachi's assistant, Divya Menon, would be making her debut as an actress in this film as Rajput's character's wife.

Initially Rani Mukerji was considered to play the female lead. However, Rani refused the role since the heroine's character had a few bold scenes. The role was later offered to Bengali actress Swastika Mukherjee. On 6 November 2014, Banerjee stated that Mukherjee's role is sketched along the lines of Mata Hari. In March 2014, reports suggested that Meiyang Chang would be seen in the film in an important role. In May 2014, it was revealed that Neeraj Kabi is also part of the film.

Filming
Shooting for the film began in early 2014, and ended on 12 May 2014. A part of the movie has been shot in Kolkata and Mumbai. Some scenes were shot in an abandoned mill in Mumbai's Byculla region. Shooting locations in Kolkata were finalised in February 2012. Shooting took place in Lalbazar, Presidency University, Coffee House and Bow Barracks. The cast was reportedly seen shooting for the film in Agarpara in January 2014.

Music

Amongst the artists in the album, Sneha Khanwalkar is the only musician who had composed for a soundtrack before this. The track used in the teaser, titled "Life's a Bitch", is composed by the New Delhi band Joint Family. The full song of "Bach Ke Bakshy" was published in a music video featuring Sushant, dancing in a parking lot, on 16 March 2015 in the official YRF YouTube channel. The next day, YRF uploaded all the songs in an audio jukebox format.

Marketing and promotion
Banerjee says he changed the 'i' at the end of the protagonist's surname Bakshi to 'y' for "typographical balance", stating that the 'i' felt "too thin" and that 'y' was a "stronger alphabet".

A teaser trailer for the film was released on Vine and marks the first film to do so.

The production team made a special documentary to celebrate the birthday of Howrah Bridge and did a flash mob on the bridge to the song "Calcutta Kiss" on that day.

Detective Byomkesh Bakshy! team promoted the film in Mumbai College, where a fashion show is inspired by it.

Sushant Singh Rajput promoted the film in India Poochega Sabse Shaana Kaun? and Comedy Nights with Kapil. Rajput also promoted the film in the TV series C.I.D. on 30 March 2015, where he appeared as Byomkesh with Anand Tiwari as Ajit.

Products
A mobile version game named Detective Byomkesh Bakshy!: The Game, has been launched by Games2win (G2W), which was made available on the Google Play Store. It is a hidden objects game.

The game, launched with Yash Raj Films Licensing (YRFL), the licensing division of Yash Raj Films, is based on the film, which features Sushant Singh Rajput in the lead. On completing all the levels, a 'Detective Certificate' is awarded to the players, who can post it on social media.

An apparel line titled NOIR 43 was launched at the Amazon India Fashion Week (AIFW), New Delhi, on 26 March.

Sequel
Prior to release, Banerjee expressed interest in creating a franchise based around Byomkesh Bakshy, if the first film performed well. After its release, Banerjee stated that he had the sequel ready and was hoping to start soon. Banerjee said that Byomkesh's adventures would continue with the upcoming installments exploring his relationship with his sidekick Ajit, his love interest Satyawati and his nemesis.

Reception

Critical reception
Detective Byomkesh Bakshy! received critical acclaim from critics.

Hindustan Times Rohit Vats gave it four stars out of five and stated, "The action in the film starts taking place from a distance and the director slowly involves the audience into it. Pre-independence Calcutta serves as the backdrop in the opening scenes, but it soon turns into a character. The attention to detail is obvious in almost every frame."

Koimoi Surabhi Redkar, gave it four stars out of five and said: "Detective Byomkesh Bakshy is a delicious thriller filled with elements that make you rack your brains too. This mystery is the one even you would want to solve. Watch it for an amazing story and its even better execution. Crime mysteries just got better in Bollywood! I am going for 4/5 here!"

Mid-Day Surabhi Redkar, gave four stars and said: "Don't miss it. Even if just to go back to the magical world of nostalgia created so beautifully and earnestly by Banerjee and cinematographer Nikos Andritsakis."
Kusumita Das from Deccan Chronicle rated the movie 3.5 stars out of five and noted, "The film follows the core structure of whodunit --- the chase, the red herrings, the slow cooked suspense leading up to a grand reveal. There's a generous spray of blood too, that underlines just how violent those times were."

Srijana Mitra Das of The Times of India reviewed and gave 3.5 stars out of five and wrote, "Byomkesh Bakshy is an iconic Bengali character brought to life by Sushant Singh Rajput with great elan – Sushant pulls off a role full of wry liveliness (a Sardarji cabbie nervously noting, 'Ye babu ka nut dheela hai,'), fitting the character, from flowery dhoti folds to furrowed-forehead frowns, beautifully. He's matched by dramatic Neeraj Kabi and calm Anand Tiwari who, after a Chinese gang leaves a courtyard strewn with corpses, tells caretaker Putiram (shakily precise Pradipto Kumar Chakrabarty), 'Khoon rehne de...bas chai bana de."

Indian Express, Shubhra Gupta gave it three stars out of five and mentioned, "When it switches to explicatory mode, it flattens. The tension, which is on a slow-burn, leaches out, and the film ends as less than it could have been. And that's a disappointment. But by then, you have seen a film, a real, bonafide film, not bits and pieces of nonsense masquerading as one."

IBN Live gave it three stars out of five and mentioned, "It's the snail-paced plotting, and the surprising lack of urgency and imminent danger that cripples the film. Story strands and characters are abandoned arbitrarily, only to be revisited later. The big reveal isn't too hard to guess – stick with your gut, don't let the red herrings distract you, and lo, you've figured it out. The climax too is a mess of hammy acting." Deepanjana Pal of Firstpost gave it eight out of ten.

Box office
On its first day Detective Byomkesh Bakshy! collected  nett in India. Its worldwide collection stood at ₹34.68 crores.

Awards

References

External links
 
 
 
 

2015 films
Films scored by Sneha Khanwalkar
2010s mystery thriller films
2015 action thriller films
2010s Hindi-language films
Indian mystery thriller films
Indian action thriller films
Indian historical action films
Indian detective films
Films based on Indian novels
Yash Raj Films films
Films shot in Kolkata
Films shot in Mumbai
Films set in Kolkata
Films set in 1943
Byomkesh Bakshi films
Films set in the British Raj
Films based on multiple works of a series
Indian World War II films
Films based on works by Saradindu Bandopadhyay